Robert M. Muhlestein was a Republican member of the Utah State Senate.

Muhlestein is currently the CEO of Harmony Educational Services.

Muhlestein held the state senate seat previously long held by Eldon Money a Democrat.  While he was in the state senate Muhlestein was identified as a resident of Benjamin, Utah.

Muhlestein was the principal of the American Leadership Academy in Spanish Fork, Utah.  In 2007 Muhlestein was hired as a consultant by Liberty Academy in Salem, Utah to help get it into good financial shape.

Sources
text of bill proposed by Muhlestein

See also
 54th Utah State Legislature

People from Utah County, Utah
Utah state senators
Brigham Young University alumni
American educators
Living people
People from Spanish Fork, Utah
21st-century American politicians
Year of birth missing (living people)